Mercury(II) fulminate, or Hg(CNO)2, is a primary explosive. It is highly sensitive to friction, heat and shock and is mainly used as a trigger for other explosives in percussion caps and detonators. Mercury(II) cyanate, though its chemical formula is identical, has a different atomic arrangement; the cyanate and fulminate anions are isomers.

First used as a priming composition in small copper caps beginning in the 1820s, mercury fulminate quickly replaced flints as a means to ignite black powder charges in muzzle-loading firearms. Later, during the late 19th century and most of the 20th century, mercury fulminate  became widely used in primers for self-contained rifle and pistol ammunition; it was the only practical detonator for firing projectiles until the early 20th century. Mercury fulminate has the distinct advantage over potassium chlorate of being non-corrosive, but it is known to weaken with time, by decomposing into its constituent elements. The reduced mercury which results forms amalgams with cartridge brass, weakening it, as well.  Today, mercury fulminate has been replaced in primers by more efficient chemical substances. These are non-corrosive, less toxic, and more stable over time; they include lead azide, lead styphnate, and tetrazene derivatives. In addition, none of these compounds require mercury for manufacture, supplies of which can be unreliable in wartime.

Preparation
Mercury(II) fulminate is prepared by dissolving mercury in nitric acid and adding ethanol to the solution. It was first prepared by Edward Charles Howard in 1800. The crystal structure of this compound was determined only in 2007.

Silver fulminate can be prepared in a similar way, but this salt is even more unstable than mercury fulminate; it can explode even under water and is impossible to accumulate in large amounts because it detonates under its own weight.

Decomposition
The thermal decomposition of mercury(II) fulminate can begin at temperatures as low as 100 °C, though it proceeds at a much higher rate with increasing temperature.

A possible reaction for the decomposition of mercury(II) fulminate yields carbon dioxide gas, nitrogen gas, and a combination of relatively stable mercury salts.
4 Hg(CNO)2 → 2 CO2 +  N2 +  HgO + 3 Hg(OCN)CN
Hg(CNO)2 → 2 CO +  N2 +   Hg  
Hg(CNO)2 → :Hg(OCN)2 (cyanate or / and isocyanate)
2 Hg(CNO)2 → 2 CO2 +  N2 +  Hg + Hg(CN)2 (mercury(II) cyanide)

In popular culture
In the 1955 film Mister Roberts, Ensign Pulver (Jack Lemmon) acquires fulminate of mercury.  Intending to blow up his unpopular captain's bunk as a prank, he accidentally destroys the ship's laundry instead.

In the episode "Crazy Handful of Nothin'" of the television series Breaking Bad, Walter White uses fulminated Mercury to blow up the office of meth kingpin Tuco Salamanca. However, the depiction of the substance and its effects in the show is questionable in terms of scientific accuracy.

See also
 Fulminic acid
 Potassium fulminate

References

External links

National Pollutant Inventory - Mercury and compounds Fact Sheet

Mercury(II) compounds
Fulminates
Explosive chemicals